Costantini de' Servi (1554–1622) was an Italian painter, sculptor, garden designer and architect in the Renaissance.

Early life
Born in 1554, de' Servi was the son of a diplomat.

Career
Primarily a sculptor and Medicean architect, de' Servi also painted. He primarily did religious-themed works for some of the European courts. His only known surviving painting, Virgin and Child was shown at the Cleveland Museum of Art. A tondo (round) work of oil on panel, the painting was begun in 1590 and completed in 1610. It was gifted to Cleveland Museum in Ohio by  Mr. and Mrs. Preston H. Saunders in 1971.

He travelled constantly, reaching as far west as the court of James I in London, and as far east as Persia. Like many of his contemporaries, de' Servi also designed masques for the Stuart court, though they were unsuccessful

At one point he completed a detailed design for an Italianate garden at Richmond Palace, London, for the teenage Henry, Prince of Wales and heir to James 1. Henry's death in 1612 from typhoid ended the project. At that politically sensitive time, de' Servi had stepped in as matchmaker, providing a likeness of Henry's intended, Caterina, whom the Medicis wanted the Prince to marry, but would not supply her portrait.

Spy
More recent research conducted by Davide Martino, a history student at St John's College at Cambridge, suggests that Costantini de' Servi might have actually been a spy employed by the powerful Medici family of Florence. The thesis is based on the fact that the artist traveled constantly for work, was constantly by the Medici, and completed few projects. Only a spare few samples of his completed work survive today. There are also no portraits of him.

Retirement
The architect ended up quietly, back in Italy, wealthy, in a grand house and garden of his own design., dying in 1622, aged 68.

References

1554 births
16th-century Italian painters
Italian male painters
17th-century Italian painters
1622 deaths